Andrei Aleksandrovich Akimov (12 October 1890 – 1916) was a Russian football player who died during World War I. He was serving as a lieutenant when he died.

International career
Akimov made his debut for the Russian Empire on June 30, 1912, in a 1912 Olympics match against Finland, and scored a goal in that game.

See also
 List of Olympians killed in World War I

References

External links
  Profile

1890 births
1916 deaths
People from Vladimir Governorate
Russian footballers
Russia international footballers
Footballers at the 1912 Summer Olympics
Olympic footballers of Russia
Imperial Russian Army personnel
Russian military personnel killed in World War I
Association football midfielders